Bellerophinidae is an extinct family of sea snails, marine gastropod molluscs in the clade Littorinimorpha.

According to taxonomy of the Gastropoda by Bouchet & Rocroi (2005) the family Pterotracheidae has no subfamilies.

References